Erdelyia is a genus of millipedes belonging to the family Xystodesmidae.

The species of this genus are found in Eastern North America.

Species:
 Erdelyia saucra Hoffman, 1962

References

Xystodesmidae